Sweet Salvation may refer to:
"Sweet Salvation", a song by the Cult from the album Ceremony, 1991
"Sweet Salvation", a song by Stephanie Mills from the album Movin' in the Right Direction, 1974
"Sweet Salvation", a song by the Stepkids from the album Troubadour, 2013
Sweet Salvation, a 2014 album by The Last Vegas
"Sweet Salvation", an audio play in the Big Finish Doctor Who series